Leigh Atkinson (born 10 June 1958) is an English former swimmer. He competed in the men's 100 metre breaststroke at the 1980 Summer Olympics.

References

External links
 

1958 births
Living people
People from Bishop's Stortford
Sportspeople from Hertfordshire
British male swimmers
Olympic swimmers of Great Britain
Swimmers at the 1980 Summer Olympics
British male breaststroke swimmers